The 33rd Infantry Division (33-ya Pekhotnaya Diviziya) was an infantry formation of the Russian Imperial Army. By the outbreak of World War I, it was part of the 21st Army Corps in the Kiev Military District. It was originally formed on 13 August 1863 by an order of the Minister of War that established 12 new infantry divisions (23rd to 34th). After the 1917 Russian Revolution and the declaration of independence by Ukraine, the 33rd Infantry Division became the basis for the formation of the Ukrainian People's Army 14th Infantry Division.

Organization
Russian infantry divisions consisted of a staff, two infantry brigades, and one artillery brigade.
1st Brigade
129th Bessarabia Infantry Regiment
130th Kherson Infantry Regiment
2nd Brigade
131st Tiraspol Infantry Regiment
132nd Bendersky Infantry Regiment
33rd Artillery Brigade

Commanders
1871-1876: Pyotr Vannovskiy

Commanders of the 2nd Brigade
1878: Dmitrij Petrovich Dohturov

References

Infantry divisions of the Russian Empire
Military units and formations established in 1863
Military units and formations disestablished in 1918